Nav Bajwa (born 26 September 1989), is a Pollywood film actor, director, writer, singer and pilot. Nav Bajwa won the dance show Aja Nach Le by MH1 in 2007. Nav Bajwa made his acting debut with Pure Punjabi (2012).He appears in 12 movies as lead actor His directorial debut film Raduaa (2018). He made his singing debut with the track Badmashi(2019) music by DJ FLOW

Personal life
Nav Bajwa was born to a Punjabi family in Patiala, India. His father is a retired Air Force Personnel. Nav's sister is a gymnast.

Filmography

Awards and nominations

Songs

Social causes 

He is a member of a non-governmental organisation (NGO) from Chandigarh working for the betterment of mentally disabled people. He gives and organizes charity shows for noble causes as well.

References

External links
 
 Nav Bajwa on  Instagram.
 Nav Bajwa on  Facebook.

1989 births
Punjabi people
Male actors in Hindi cinema
Living people
Commercial aviators